SV Atlétiko Flamingo Bonaire is a football club from Nikiboko in Bonaire in the Caribbean Netherlands, playing at the top level.

History
The club was founded in 2008, and have been competing at the top flight since the 2015 season. They play their home games at the Stadion Antonio Trenidat, in nearby Rincon, Bonaire to a capacity of 1,500 people.

Squad

Honours
Bonaire League: 1
 2015–16

References

Football clubs in Bonaire
Football clubs in the Netherlands Antilles
Association football clubs established in 2008
2008 establishments in Bonaire